Pleochroism (from Greek πλέων, pléōn, "more" and χρῶμα, khrôma, "color") is an optical phenomenon in which a substance has different colors when observed at different angles, especially with polarized light.

Background 
Anisotropic crystals will have optical properties that vary with the direction of light. The direction of the electric field determines the polarization of light, and crystals will respond in different ways if this angle is changed. These kinds of crystals have one or two optical axes. If absorption of light varies with the angle relative to the optical axis in a crystal then pleochroism results.

Anisotropic crystals have double refraction of light where light of different polarizations is bent different amounts by the crystal, and therefore follows different paths through the crystal. The components of a divided light beam follow different paths within the mineral and travel at different speeds. When the mineral is observed at some angle, light following some combination of paths and polarizations will be present, each of which will have had light of different colors absorbed. At another angle, the light passing through the crystal will be composed of another combination of light paths and polarizations, each with their own color. The light passing through the mineral will therefore have different colors when it is viewed from different angles, making the stone seem to be of different colors.

Tetragonal, trigonal, and hexagonal minerals can only show two colors and are called dichroic. Orthorhombic, monoclinic, and triclinic crystals can show three and are trichroic. For example, hypersthene, which has two optical axes, can have a red, yellow, or blue appearance when oriented in three different ways in three-dimensional space. Isometric minerals cannot exhibit pleochroism. Tourmaline is notable for exhibiting strong pleochroism. Gems are sometimes cut and set either to display pleochroism or to hide it, depending on the colors and their attractiveness.

The pleochroic colors are at their maximum when light is polarized parallel with a principal optical vector. The axes are designated X, Y, and Z for direction, and alpha, beta, and gamma in magnitude of the refractive index. These axes can be determined from the appearance of a crystal in a conoscopic interference pattern. Where there are two optical axes, the acute bisectrix of the axes gives Z for positive minerals and X for negative minerals and the obtuse bisectrix gives the alternative axis (X or Z). Perpendicular to these is the Y axis. The color is measured with the polarization parallel to each direction. An absorption formula records the amount of absorption parallel to each axis in the form of X < Y < Z with the left most having the least absorption and the rightmost the most.

In mineralogy and gemology 
Pleochroism is an extremely useful tool in mineralogy and gemology for mineral and gem identification, since the number of colors visible from different angles can identify the possible crystalline structure of a gemstone or mineral and therefore help to classify it.  Minerals that are otherwise very similar often have very different pleochroic color schemes. In such cases, a thin section of the mineral is used and examined under polarized transmitted light with a petrographic microscope. Another device using this property to identify minerals is the dichroscope.

List of pleochroic minerals

Purple and violet

Amethyst (very low): different shades of purple
Andalusite (strong): green-brown / dark red / purple
Beryl (medium): purple / colorless
Corundum (high): purple / orange
Hypersthene (strong): purple / orange
Spodumene (Kunzite) (strong): purple / clear / pink
Tourmaline (strong): pale purple / purple
Putnisite: pale purple / bluish grey

Blue

Aquamarine (medium): clear / light blue, or light blue / dark blue
Alexandrite (strong): dark red-purple / orange / green
Apatite (strong): blue-yellow / blue-colorless
Benitoite (strong): colorless / dark blue
Cordierite (aka Iolite) (orthorhombic; very strong): pale yellow / violet / pale blue
Corundum (strong): dark violet-blue / light blue-green
Tanzanite See Zoisite
Topaz (very low): colorless / pale blue / pink
Tourmaline (strong): dark blue / light blue
Zoisite (strong): blue / red-purple / yellow-green
Zircon (strong): blue / clear / gray

Green

Alexandrite (strong): dark red / orange / green
Andalusite (strong): brown-green / dark red
Corundum (strong): green / yellow-green
Emerald (strong): green / blue-green
Peridot (low): yellow-green / green / colorless
Titanite (medium): brown-green / blue-green
Tourmaline (strong): blue-green / brown-green / yellow-green
Zircon (low): greenish brown / green
Kornerupine (strong): green / pale yellowish-brown / reddish-brown
Hiddenite (strong): blue-green / emerald-green / yellow-green

Yellow

Citrine (very weak): different shades of pale yellow
Chrysoberyl (very weak): red-yellow / yellow-green / green
Corundum (weak): yellow / pale yellow
Danburite (weak): very pale yellow / pale yellow
Kasolite (weak): pale yellow / grey
Orthoclase (weak): different shades of pale yellow
Phenacite (medium): colorless / yellow-orange
Spodumene (medium): different shades of pale yellow
Topaz (medium): tan / yellow / yellow-orange
Tourmaline (medium): pale yellow / dark yellow
Zircon (weak): tan / yellow
Hornblende (strong): light green / dark green / yellow / brown
Segnitite (weak): pale to medium yellow

Brown and orange

Corundum (strong): yellow-brown / orange
Topaz (medium): brown-yellow / dull brown-yellow
Tourmaline (very low): dark brown / light brown
Zircon (very weak): brown-red / brown-yellow
Biotite (medium): brown

Red and pink

Alexandrite (strong): dark red / orange / green
Andalusite (strong): dark red / brown-red
Corundum (strong): violet-red / orange-red
Morganite (medium): light red / red-violet
Tourmaline (strong): dark red / light red
Zircon (medium): purple / red-brown

See also
 Birefringence
 Medieval sunstone

References 

Mineralogy
Optical mineralogy
Microscopy
Gemology